Conrad Detrez (1 April 1937, in Roclenge-sur-Geer – 11 February 1985, in Paris) was a Belgian (from 1982 on French) journalist, diplomat and novelist.

Biography
Conrad Detrez grew up in a small village in the Belgian countryside. In 1962 he traveled to Brazil as a lay missionary. He first stayed in Volta Redonda and from 1963 in Rio de Janeiro. He was a university teacher while at the same time working in the favelas. He discovered his homosexuality and gradually became involved in the resistance to the military dictatorship that was installed in 1964 in Brazil.

After being arrested and expelled from Rio de Janeiro in 1967, Detrez stayed some months in Paris, participating in the revolt of May 68. He returned to São Paulo where he became a journalist. In 1969 he secretly met and interviewed Brazilian guerrilla leader Carlos Marighella.

In the 1970s Detrez stayed in Algeria (as a teacher) and in Lisbon (as a radio journalist) after the Portuguese Carnation Revolution.

Before his writing career Detrez translated books by the Brazilian writers Jorge Amado and Antonio Callado. In 1978 he won the Prix Renaudot for his autobiographical novel L'Herbe à brûler.

In 1982 Detrez became a diplomat for the French government in Nicaragua. He died of AIDS.

Critical reception
Poet James Kirkup found Le dragueur de Dieu "beautifully written in a fluent, lucid and visionary manner" and praised the mixture of religious sensuality and intellectual mysticism. "Writers in other countries seem able to reconcile sexual and religious themes in their works in a way that is rarely found in English or American authors."

Lydia Davis translated two of Detrez's novels into English. A Weed for Burning was labeled in the Los Angeles Times an "extremely ambitious novel". "Detrez is still an unfinished writer", claimed Time. "But he has a sense of the appropriate image and the right valedictory tone." The Village Voice praised his "effectiveness as a storyteller".

Chilean historian Rafael Pedemonte calls Detrez "a thrilling figure, unfairly forgotten after his premature death".

Works
 Carlos Marighella, Conrad Detrez, Pour la liberation du Bresil Aubier-Montaigne, 1970.
 Márcio Moreira Alves, Conrad Detrez, Carlos Marighella, Zerschlagt die Wohlstandsinseln der Dritten Welt, Rowohlt, 1971.
Les pâtres de la nuit: roman, Stock, 1975.
L'herbe à brûler: roman, 1977; Labor, 2003.
A Weed for Burning, Harcourt Brace Jovanovich, 1984.
Caballero ou l'irrésistible corps de l'homme-dieu, Galerie Jade, 1980.
La lutte finale, Balland, 1980; Balland, 1996.
Le dragueur de Dieu: roman, Calmann-Lévy, 1980.
Les Noms de la tribu, Seuil, 1981
Le mâle apôtre: poèmes, Persona, 1982
La guerre blanche: roman, Calmann-Lévy, 1982.
La ceinture de feu: roman,  Gallimard, 1984.
Zone of Fire, Harcourt Brace Jovanovich, 1986.
La mélancolie du voyeur, Denoël, 1986.
Ludo: roman, Labor, 1988.
Les plumes du coq, Actes sud, 1995.

References

Belgian male novelists
Belgian writers in French
Prix Renaudot winners
Gay novelists
20th-century Belgian novelists
1937 births
1985 deaths
20th-century Belgian male writers
Belgian gay writers
Belgian LGBT novelists
AIDS-related deaths in Belgium
20th-century Belgian LGBT people